Amiran Mujiri (born 20 February 1974) is a former Georgian footballer who played as a central midfielder.

Career
He signed for CSKA Sofia in December 2003. Mujiri became a regular in the 2004–05 season, playing 28 games in the A PFG, and two in the UEFA Cup First Round. Mujiri left for Kallithea in end of the season, but in January 2006, he moved to Greek Cyprus for Anorthosis Famagusta. Following a short spells in hometown club Dinamo Batumi, Mujiri played for Baku between 2007 and 2010.

International career
Mujiri made his debut for Georgia on 29 March 1997, against Armenia.

Honours
Dinamo Tbilisi
 Umaglesi Liga: 1998–99

CSKA Sofia
 Bulgarian A Group: 2004–05

FK Baku
 Azerbaijan Premier League: 2008–09

References

External links
 
 

Footballers from Georgia (country)
Expatriate footballers from Georgia (country)
Georgia (country) international footballers
Maccabi Petah Tikva F.C. players
Hapoel Jerusalem F.C. players
FC Dinamo Tbilisi players
PFC Marek Dupnitsa players
PFC CSKA Sofia players
Kallithea F.C. players
Anorthosis Famagusta F.C. players
FC Baku players
FK Standard Sumgayit players
Erovnuli Liga players
First Professional Football League (Bulgaria) players
Super League Greece players
Cypriot First Division players
Azerbaijan Premier League players
Expatriate footballers in Israel
Expatriate footballers in Bulgaria
Expatriate footballers in Greece
Expatriate footballers in Cyprus
Expatriate footballers in Azerbaijan
Association football midfielders
Sportspeople from Batumi
1974 births
Living people
Expatriate sportspeople from Georgia (country) in Azerbaijan